The  is a  character chosen by the  through a national ballot in Japan, starting in 1995. The character with the most votes, selected to represent the events of that year, is announced in a ceremony on December 12 (Kanji Day) at Kiyomizu Temple.

See also
 Word of the year - Japan sponsors an annual word of the year contest called "U-Can New and Trendy Word Grand Prix" (U-Can shingo, ryūkōgo taishō) sponsored by Jiyu Kokuminsha.

References

External links
Japanese Kanji Proficiency Society

Kanji
Japanese culture
Japan
1995 establishments in Japan
December events